Irada Suleyman qizi Ashumova (born February 25, 1958 in Baku, Azerbaijan SSR) is a female Azerbaijani sport shooter. She was the first woman to represent Azerbaijan at the Olympics.

She competed in the 25 m Pistol competition at the 2004 Summer Olympics and won the bronze medal. She won a silver medal in the 2002 World Championships.

In the 2004 Olympics she also competed in 10 m Air Pistol without winning anything. However, she was part of the Soviet national team that set a team world record of 1152 in this discipline in 1985.

She competed in the 2012 Olympics 

Ashumova is a teacher at the Azerbaijan Institute of Physical Culture in Baku. She has been a scholarship holder with the Olympic Solidarity program since November 2002. She is married to sport shooting coach Vladimir Lunev and is the mother of young shooter Ruslan Lunev.

References

External links
 
 

1958 births
Living people
Azerbaijani female sport shooters
ISSF pistol shooters
Shooters at the 1996 Summer Olympics
Shooters at the 2000 Summer Olympics
Shooters at the 2004 Summer Olympics
Shooters at the 2012 Summer Olympics
Olympic shooters of Azerbaijan
Olympic bronze medalists for Azerbaijan
Sportspeople from Baku
Olympic medalists in shooting
Azerbaijani educators
Medalists at the 2004 Summer Olympics
Shooters at the 2015 European Games
European Games competitors for Azerbaijan
20th-century Azerbaijani educators
21st-century Azerbaijani educators